Stentz may refer to:
 Zack Stentz, one of the scriptwriters of 2003 film Agent Cody Banks
 Stentz is an official codename for Fedora Core release 4
 Stentz's Algorithm

German-language surnames